Fazio Cardano (1444 – 28 August 1524) was an Italian jurist and mathematician.  He was a student of perspective.  Cardano was also a professor at the University of Pavia, and was devoted to hermetical science and the world of the occult.  He was a friend of Leonardo da Vinci.

It was said that Cardano was always in the company of a familiar spirit who talked to him.  This may be a rumour originating from a habit of speaking to himself.

Fazio Cardano was the father of Gerolamo Cardano.

References

External links
 Storia di Milano, Cronologia di Gerolamo Cardano (Italian)

15th-century Italian mathematicians
16th-century Italian mathematicians
1444 births
1524 deaths